Rachael Lampa is the self-titled third album from Christian pop singer Rachael Lampa, released in 2004 on Word Records. The album contains more of a pop rock feel compared to Lampa's earlier releases (among other genres). The track "All This Time" is an example of this style.

Track listing

Personnel 

 Racheal Lampa – lead vocals, backing vocals 
 Tommy Sims – various instruments, acoustic piano, guitars, bass, Moog bass, horn arrangements, string arrangements
 Ziggy – programming 
 Chris Rodriguez – guitars, acoustic guitar, dobro
 Paul Moak – guitars 
 Pete Orta – guitars 
 Robert Randolph – steel guitar (8)
 Akil Thompson – bass
 Bernie Harris – piccolo bass, talk box
 Lamont Carter – drums 
 Will Sayles – drums 
 Marvin Sims – drums 
 Javier Solis – percussion 
 Mark Douthit – saxophones 
 Barry Green – trombone
 Mike Haynes – trumpet 
 Tim Akers – string arrangements and conductor 
 David Davidson – string arrangements and contractor 
 Michael Omartian – string arrangements and conductor 
 Carl Gorodetzky – string contractor
 Kendra Carr – backing vocals 
 Nirva Dorsaint – backing vocals 
 Jason Eskridge – backing vocals 
 Jamie Fraley – backing vocals 
 Sherrie Kibble – backing vocals 
 Nikki Leonti – backing vocals 
 Kimberly Mont – backing vocals 
 Shandra Penix – backing vocals 
 Tiffany Ransom – backing vocals 
 T-Bone – rap (2)

Production

 Racheal Lampa – executive producer 
 Eric Wright – executive producer 
 Chris Rodriguez – A&R direction 
 Tommy Sims – producer, engineer, mixing 
 Bryan Lenox – engineer, mixing 
 Nathaniel Chan – engineer 
 Drew Douthit – assistant engineer, digital editing 
 Terry Christian – string engineer 
 F. Reid Shippen – mixing 
 Tom Coyne – mastering 
 Randy LeRoy – mastering
 Mark Lusk – artist development
 Katherine Petillo – creative direction,  art direction
 Wayne Brezinka – art direction, design, collage
 Kristin Barlowe – photography 
 David Kaufman – wardrobe stylist 
 Melanie Shelley – hair stylist, make-up

Singles
"When I Fall"
"No Other One"                                                                       
"Outrageous"

References 

2004 albums
Rachael Lampa albums
Contemporary R&B albums by American artists